Robert Connor may refer to:

Bob Connor (born 1925), English professional footballer
Bobby Connor (born 1960), Scottish international footballer
Robert Connor (politician) (1837–1896), Wisconsin State Assemblyman
Robert Connor (tennis), South African tennis player
Robert Digges Wimberly Connor (1878–1950), first Archivist of the United States
Robert J. Connor, American politician from Rockland County, New York
Robert T. Connor (1919–2009), American politician in New York City

See also
Robert O'Connor (disambiguation)
Bobby Connors (1902–1931), ice hockey player